USS Mullany (DD-325) was a  built for the United States Navy during World War I.

Description
The Clemson class was a repeat of the preceding  although more fuel capacity was added. They had a crew of 6 officers and 108 enlisted men.

Performance differed radically between the ships of the class, often due to poor workmanship. The Clemson class was powered by two steam turbines, each driving one propeller shaft, using steam provided by four water-tube boilers.

The ships were armed with four 4-inch (102 mm) guns in single mounts and were fitted with two  1-pounder guns for anti-aircraft defense. In many ships a shortage of 1-pounders caused them to be replaced by 3-inch (76 mm) guns. Their primary weapon, though, was their torpedo battery of a dozen 21 inch (533 mm) torpedo tubes in four triple mounts. They also carried a pair of depth charge rails. A "Y-gun" depth charge thrower was added to many ships.

Construction and career
Mullany named for James Robert Madison Mullany, was laid down 3 June 1919 by Bethlehem Shipbuilding Corporation, San Francisco, California; launched 9 July 1920; sponsored by Miss Alice Lee Hall; and commissioned at Mare Island Navy Yard 29 March 1921. Based at San Diego, California, Mullany operated along the west coast through most of her career, sailing annually to the Panama Canal Zone and the Caribbean for combined fleet maneuvers. She left San Francisco, California 15 April 1925 for fleet tactics in Hawaiian waters, from which she sailed 1 July with the battle fleet on a good will cruise via Samoa to Australia and New Zealand. Mullany returned to San Diego 27 September. In 1928, she twice cruised to Hawaii, first for fleet maneuvers, and later training naval reservists. She decommissioned 1 May 1930 at San Diego. Her name was struck from the Navy list 18 November 1930 and she was sold for scrapping 19 March 1931.

Notes

References

External links 
http://www.navsource.org/archives/05/325.htm

 

Clemson-class destroyers
Ships built in San Francisco
1920 ships